Eric Alexander Watson (20 July 1925 – 25 March 2017) was a New Zealand cricketer. He played 46 first-class matches for Otago between 1947 and 1960. A right-arm medium-pace bowler, he took 41 wickets at an average of 30.46, with best bowling figures of 4–26. With the bat, he scored 1779 runs at an average of 21.43 and a high score of 103.

Watson was also coach of the New Zealand rugby union team from 1979 to 1980. Prior to his appointment he was coach of the Otago rugby union team, and then the national under 23 side. He played rugby union once for Otago in 1946.

See also
 List of Otago representative cricketers

References

 

1925 births
2017 deaths
New Zealand cricketers
New Zealand national rugby union team coaches
Otago cricketers
Otago rugby union players
Cricketers from Dunedin